German submarine U-568 was a Type VIIC U-boat built for Nazi Germany's Kriegsmarine for service during World War II. She conducted five patrols, sinking one merchant ship, two warships, and severely damaging another warship. On 28 May 1942, she was depth charged and sunk in the Mediterranean Sea; all hands survived.

Design
German Type VIIC submarines were preceded by the smaller Type VIIB submarines. U-568 had a displacement of  while surfaced and  while submerged. She had two shafts and two  propellers.

U-568 was fitted with five  torpedo tubes (four fitted at the bow and one at the stern), fourteen torpedoes, one  SK C/35 naval gun, 220 rounds, and a  C/30 anti-aircraft gun. The boat had a complement of between forty-four and sixty, and surrendered with 47 on board.

Construction and career
U-568 was ordered on 24 October 1939 and laid down six months later. It was launched on 6 March 1941. On 1 May 1941, it was commissioned; it started training the same day as part of 3rd U-boat Flotilla. The submarine completed training on 1 August 1941 and was placed under the command of Kapitänleutnant Joachim Preuss, who had already conducted five patrols with U-10.

First patrol
U-568 departed Trondheim on 3 August 1941 and was assigned to U-boat Wolfpack Grönland in the North Atlantic Ocean, arriving there a week later. On 12 August, the submarine attacked Convoy ON 4, firing two torpedoes at a "tanker" and convoy escort Flower-class corvette  (925 tons). The torpedo fired at the "tanker" went wide, but Preuss observed how the corvette "sinks immediately as her depth charges detonate (five or six of them)". All hands on board Picobee were killed in action. Other escorts stopped and held the U-boat down while the rest of the convoy escaped. Afterwards, U-568 had short stints with Woflpacks Kurfürst (23 August – 2 September 1941) and Seewolf (2 – 8 September 1941), arriving at  homeport Saint-Nazaire on 10 September 1941.

Second patrol
U-568 embarked on her second patrol on 9 October 1941. On her way west into the Atlantic, she attacked Convoy SC 48 on 16 October 1941, sinking the steam merchant ship Empire Heron with two torpedoes and killing forty-two on board. The next day, she fired a spread of four torpedoes at the United States Navy destroyer  (1,630 tons) having been repeatedly depth-charged by her the previous night. One torpedo hit the ship starboard, killing 11 sailors. The submarine attempted to sink Pictou with a torpedo, but it passed  to port and missed. Afterwards, the U-boat retreated. The Kearny incident was cited by Adolf Hitler as being reasoning for Nazi Germany declaring war against the United States, with Hitler presenting the action as starting with the Kearny  attacking U-568 with depth charges.

Between 21 and 31 October 1941, U-568 was part of Wolfpack Reissewolf. After her attack on Convoy SC 48, the remainder of her patrol was routine, and she arrived at Saint-Nazaire on 7 November 1941.

Wolfpacks
She took part in four wolfpacks, namely:
 Grönland (10 – 23 August 1941)
 Kurfürst (23 August – 2 September 1941)
 Seewolf (2 – 8 September 1941)
 Reissewolf (21 – 31 October 1941)

Fate
All 47 hands survived.

Summary of raiding history

See also
 Mediterranean U-boat Campaign (World War II)

References

Notes

Citations

Bibliography

External links

German Type VIIC submarines
1941 ships
U-boats commissioned in 1941
U-boats sunk by depth charges
U-boats sunk by British warships
U-boats sunk in 1942
World War II submarines of Germany
World War II shipwrecks in the Mediterranean Sea
Ships built in Hamburg
Maritime incidents in May 1942